Panrepur is a village in Aurangabad district in the Indian state of Bihar.

References

Villages in Aurangabad district, Bihar